Odahuttidavalu is a 2006 Indian Kannada-language drama film directed by Sai Prakash and produced by K. Manju. The film stars V. Ravichandran, Rakshita and Radhika in the leading roles.

The film was a remake of Tamil film Porkkaalam (1997) directed by Cheran. The film received mixed reviews.

Cast  
 Ravichandran 
 Rakshita
 Radhika
 Komal Kumar

Soundtrack 
The music is composed by R. P. Patnaik. Lyrics were written by Gururaj Hoskote, Kaviraj and K. Kalyan. The song "Thanjavooru Mannu" from the original film has been retained here as "Mandyadinda Mannu".

References

External links 

 Odahuttidavalu review
 review

2006 films
2000s Kannada-language films
Indian romance films
Kannada remakes of Tamil films
Films directed by Sai Prakash
2000s romance films